Hiroshi Masuda (born 23 October 1901, date of death unknown) was a Japanese track and field athlete. He competed in the men's pentathlon at the 1920 Summer Olympics.

References

1901 births
Year of death missing
Place of birth missing
Japanese pentathletes
Japanese decathletes
Japanese male shot putters
Japanese male javelin throwers
Olympic male pentathletes
Olympic athletes of Japan
Athletes (track and field) at the 1920 Summer Olympics
Japan Championships in Athletics winners
20th-century Japanese people